Cervasca is a comune (municipality) in the Province of Cuneo in the Italian region Piedmont, located about  south of Turin and about  west of Cuneo.

Cervasca borders the following municipalities: Bernezzo, Caraglio, Cuneo, Roccasparvera, and Vignolo.

Twin towns — sister cities
Cervasca is twinned with:

  Allos, France

References

Cities and towns in Piedmont